Bradley Seaton (born November 23, 1993) is a former American football offensive tackle. He played college football at Villanova.

Professional career

Tennessee Titans
Seaton was drafted by the Tennessee Titans in the seventh round, 236th overall, in the 2017 NFL Draft. He was waived on September 2, 2017. He was re-signed to the practice squad on September 20, 2017. He was released on November 9, 2017.

Tampa Bay Buccaneers
On November 29, 2017, Seaton was signed to the Tampa Bay Buccaneers' practice squad. He signed a reserve/future contract with the Buccaneers on January 3, 2018.

Cleveland Browns
The Cleveland Browns signed Seaton to their practice squad on September 4, 2018. The Browns signed Seaton to a futures contract on January 2, 2019. Seaton was waived by the Browns on August 31, 2019.

Tampa Bay Buccaneers (second stint)
On September 1, 2019, Seaton was signed to the Tampa Bay Buccaneers practice squad. He signed a reserve/future contract with the Buccaneers on December 30, 2019.

On August 6, 2020, Seaton opted out of the 2020 season due to the COVID-19 pandemic. Without him, the Buccaneers went on to win Super Bowl LV.

On August 31, 2021, Seaton was waived/injured by the Buccaneers and placed on injured reserve. He was released on October 21.

On April 19, 2022, Seaton announced his retirement.

References

External links
Villanova Wildcats bio

1993 births
Living people
Sportspeople from the Bronx
Players of American football from New York City
American football offensive tackles
Villanova Wildcats football players
Tennessee Titans players
Tampa Bay Buccaneers players
Cleveland Browns players
Brunswick School alumni